West Seneca West Senior High is a public, co-educational high school in the West Seneca Central School District and serves grades nine through twelve in West Seneca, New York, United States. It is accredited by the New York State Board of Regents.

West Seneca Senior High School, built in 1947, was renamed West Seneca West Senior High School in 1969, after overcrowding resulted in the building of West Seneca East Senior High School. A continued population surge created a need for a three-floor addition in the 1970s, which included two floors of science and math laboratories and housing for a larger library and student services office. This addition is now known to the students as the new wing while the original floor plan, which was also modified, is known as the old wing. The addition also created the space over the main entrance, known as "the bridge", a multi-use academic space, also providing a second access to the new wing from the old wing.

Notable alumni
 Matt Anderson- Professional volleyball player, member of 2012 London Olympic team
 Jeremy Kelley - Former NFL wide receiver, and currently alumni manager of the Buffalo Bills
 Justin Strzelczyk - NFL offensive lineman
 Keith Rothfus - US Congressman

References

West Seneca West Senior High School at West Seneca Central Schools
school report card

Public high schools in New York (state)
Schools in Erie County, New York